William David Cohan (born 1960) is an American business writer.

Early life and education
Cohan was born in Worcester, Massachusetts on February 20, 1960. His father was an accountant and his mother worked in administration. 
Cohan is a graduate of Duke University, Columbia University School of Journalism, and Columbia University Graduate School of Business.

Career
Cohan was an investigative reporter for the Raleigh Times. He then worked on Wall Street for seventeen years as a mergers and acquisitions banker. He spent six years at Lazard Frères in New York, then Merrill Lynch, and later became a managing director at JP Morgan Chase. He also worked for two years at GE Capital. 
Since 2013, he has served as a trustee of the National Humanities Center in Research Triangle Park, NC.

Vanity Fair controversy
In 2019, Cohan alleged the possibility that US president Donald Trump or someone close to him had used advance knowledge of political developments to profit from insider trading, publicized in two articles for Vanity Fair  titled "'Who Knew Trump Would Offer a Truce With Xi?': The Mystery of the Wall Street Trump Trades" and "'There Is Definite Hanky-Panky Going On': The Fantastically Profitable Mystery of the Trump Chaos Trades". Cohan's second article caused congressional representatives Ted Lieu and Kathleen Rice to call for a federal investigation, but several experts interviewed by Bloomberg questioned the evidence, while Cohan stood by the article but distanced himself from the implied conclusion ("I don’t make any allegations, I don’t know what really happened"). Writing in Slate, Felix Salmon called Cohan's articles "bullshit", arguing that he had no evidence that the trades in question were unusual, or that they had yielded the alleged profits, or that insider knowledge had been involved at all. Further, Terry Duffy, the CEO of CME Group Inc, the company that operates the exchange where the futures trade, questioned Cohan's understanding of the data, "[Cohan] mistakenly summed up all volume for those derivatives during spans of time and implausibly attributed that buying and selling, spread across thousands of transactions, to a single bad actor or group of cheaters."  Cohan's piece, however, is explicit that the trades may have been carried out by many individuals and that "There is no way ... to know who is making these trades. But regulators know or can find out."

Personal life

In 1991 he married editor Deborah Gail Futter in a Jewish ceremony.

Books 
The Last Tycoons: The Secret History of Lazard Frères & Co. (2007). Winner, Financial Times and Goldman Sachs Business Book of the Year Award.
House of Cards: A Tale of Hubris and Wretched Excess on Wall Street (2009).  The last days of Bear Stearns & Co. In a talk about the book at Cal State Long Beach, Cohan said he felt it was his mission to get a response to questions left unanswered by Wall Street CEOs.
Money and Power: How Goldman Sachs Came to Rule the World (2011). Examines the historical role and influence of Goldman Sachs.
The Price of Silence: The Duke Lacrosse Scandal, the Power of the Elite, and the Corruption of Our Great Universities (2014). The story of the Duke lacrosse case.
Why Wall Street Matters (2017).
Four Friends: Promising Lives Cut Short (2019). Portraits of Cohan's boarding school roommates at Andover: John F. Kennedy, Jr., Jack Berman, Will Daniel, and Harry Bull.
Power Failure: The Rise and Fall of an American Icon (2022).  798 pp.  About the General Electric Company.

References

External links

1960 births
Living people
American business writers
American economics writers
American male non-fiction writers
American investigative journalists
Duke University alumni
Columbia University Graduate School of Journalism alumni
Columbia Business School alumni
American magazine journalists
Phillips Academy alumni
Writers from Worcester, Massachusetts
21st-century American non-fiction writers
21st-century American male writers